Doriprismatica dendrobranchia is a species of sea slug, a dorid nudibranch, a shell-less marine gastropod mollusk in the family Chromodorididae.

Distribution 
This species is found only off the Great Barrier Reef in Australia.

References

Chromodorididae
Molluscs of the Pacific Ocean
Gastropods of Australia
Endemic fauna of Australia
Gastropods described in 1990
Taxa named by William B. Rudman